is a manufacturer of heavy rail cars in Japan, formerly known as . The company is based in Kanazawa-ku, Yokohama, and a member of East Japan Railway Company (JR East) group. J-TREC manufactures rail vehicles not only for JR East and Tokyu Corporation but for other Japanese operators, including various Japan Railways Group companies and international operators as well.

Tokyu Car Corporation, the predecessor of J-TREC, was founded on 23 August 1948. Tokyu Car was a licensee of early-generation (early-1960s) stainless-steel commuter EMU train body and related bogie technology from the Budd Company of the United States. Since then, Tokyu Car has specialised in stainless-steel body car technology.

On 27 October 2011, Tokyu Car Corporation announced that its rolling stock manufacturing division would be acquired by East Japan Railway Company (JR East), and the company cease operations with effect from 1 April 2012. It is to be subsequently split into two companies, Tokyu Car Engineering and Keihin Steel Works. Both companies will be subsidiaries of JR East. The remaining parts and machinery manufacturing division will be sold to ShinMaywa Industries.

Name after selling divisions 
On 2 April 2012, divisions (were inherited by subsidiaries) were sold and renamed.
 JR East acquired:
  (founded on 9 November 2011, inherited rolling stock manufacturing division on 1 April 2012) - Name changed to 
  - Name changed to 
 
 ShinMaywa acquired:
  - Name changed to 
  - Name changed to 
  (founded on 9 November 2011, inherited parking machinery manufacturing division on 1 April 2012) - Name changed to 
  - Name changed to

Products 
Besides railway rolling stock, Tokyu Car also manufactured special duty motor vehicles (such as dump trucks, trailers and vans), which was sold to ShinMaywa.

Some Tokyu Car projects:
 Shinkansen EMU Cars
 Tokyu Corporation all trains.
 JR East 209, E217, E231, E501, E531 and E233 series EMU rail cars
 JR East E751 series EMU rail cars for limited express (2000)
 JR Shikoku 5100 type bilevel cab cars (2003)
 E259 series EMU for Narita Express with Kinki Sharyo

 Singapore MRT Kawasaki Heavy Industries C151 EMU cars with Kawasaki Heavy Industries, Nippon Sharyo and Kinki Sharyo
 Greater Cleveland Regional Transit Authority Red Line heavy rail cars
 Niagara Frontier Transportation Authority Metro Rail LRV
 US Standard Light Rail Vehicle (carshells built for Boeing Vertol)
 Iarnród Éireann/Irish Rail DART Dublin Area Rapid Transit fleet expansion EMU railcars 8500, 8510 and 8520 Classes (Dublin) with Mitsui (lead contractor)
 Iarnród Éireann/Irish Rail Commuter (formerly Arrow), both 2600 Class (original) and fleet expansion 2800 Class. (Operate on Commuter routes in Cork and Limerick) with Mitsui (lead contractor)
 Iarnród Éireann/Irish Rail InterCity (National express passenger services) fleet replacement. Tokyu Car was the bogie supplier for a fleet of high specialist 22000 Class DMUs capable of 160 km/h operation. These rolled out between 2007 and 2011 and operate services on all Irish Rail routes, except key Cork-Dublin Express services operated by CAF built Mark 4 push-pull trains capable of 200 km/h operation but run at 160 km/h at present and the Dublin-Belfast Enterprise operated by De Dietrich built push-pull stock limited to 145 km/h operating speeds. The lead contractor was Mitsui. Coaches were built by Rotem and specialist diesel-hydraulic power packs were built by MTU Friedrichshafen (engine) and Voith (transmission system).
 Taiwan Railways Administration DR2700, DR2800 series
 Metro-North Commuter Railroad (New York) M-4 EMU car for its New Haven Line (1988)
 Long Island Rail Road C1 bilevel commuter cars, with Commonwealth Engineering and Mitsui

As J-TREC:
 JR East E235 and E353 series EMU rail cars
 Bangkok MRT Purple Line EMU cars
 Shizuoka Railway A3000 series EMU cars
 Toei 5500 series EMU cars
 Tokyu 2020, 3020 & 6020 Series EMU cars
Philippine National Railways North–South Commuter Railway EM10000 class EMU cars, in a joint venture with Sumitomo Corporation

Further reading

References

External links 
Japan Transport Engineering Company
Tokyu Car Corporation Profile 

Tram manufacturers
Manufacturing companies based in Yokohama
East Japan Railway Company
Rolling stock manufacturers of Japan
Vehicle manufacturing companies established in 1948
Japanese companies established in 1948
Electric vehicle manufacturers of Japan
Rail infrastructure manufacturers
Japanese brands